The Electoral (Amendment) Act 1995 (No. 21) was a law of Ireland which revised Dáil constituencies in light of the 1991 census. It took effect on the dissolution of the 27th Dáil on 15 May 1997 and a general election for the 28th Dáil on the revised constituencies took place on 6 June 1997.

It adopted recommendations from an independent Commission chaired by Richard Johnson, judge of the High Court, which delivered its report on 27 April 1995.

It repealed the Electoral (Amendment) Act 1990, which had defined constituencies since the 1992 general election.

It was repealed by the Electoral (Amendment) (No. 2) Act 1998, which created a new schedule of constituencies first used at the 2002 general election for the 29th Dáil held on 17 May 2002.

Constituencies for the 28th Dáil
Explanation of columns
 Constituency: The name of the constituency.
 Created: The year of the election when a constituency of the same name was last created.
 Seats: The number of TDs elected from the constituency under the Act.

Summary of changes
This summarises the changes in representation. It does not address revisions to the boundaries of constituencies.

See also
Elections in the Republic of Ireland

References

Electoral 1995
1995 in Irish law
Acts of the Oireachtas of the 1990s